Wealden Edge Hangers is a  biological Site of Special Scientific Interest north of Petersfield in Hampshire. Wealden Edge Hangers is part of the East Hampshire Hangers Special Area of Conservation.

Natural England describes this site as "arguably,...one of the ecologically most interesting and diverse series of chalk woodlands in Britain". The rich ground flora includes many rare species, and 289 species of vascular plants have been recorded. There are more than 111 species of bryophytes and the lichen flora is the second richest in the country with 74 species.

References

 

Local Nature Reserves in Hampshire 
Sites of Special Scientific Interest in Hampshire
National nature reserves in England
Special Areas of Conservation in England